According to urban legend, Goatman is a creature resembling a goat-human hybrid often credited with canine deaths and purported to take refuge in the woods of Prince George's County, Maryland, United States.

History
Goatman stories originated in the early 1970s but some of its legends are set in the 50s, within Prince George's County, following the disappearances and/or deaths of multiple dogs, which were later attributed to the creature. However, given the condition of remains, the deaths may more likely have been the result of passing trains. Despite evidence to the contrary, stories of Goatman's existence continued to circulate, especially among local students. Graffiti reading, "Goatman was here," was not uncommon, and law enforcement would habitually receive calls of reported sightings, albeit with a number being pranks.

The creature was commonly claimed to have a human face but with a body covered in hair. However, descriptions differed on whether Goatman greater resembled a hairy humanoid or a human with the lower portion of a goat similar to the fauns of Greek mythology.

As well, Goatman was rumored to reside in a makeshift shelter in the wooded region of northwestern Prince George's County near the vicinity of Bowie. Occasionally, it was rumored that Goatman would venture out to kill a dog or rush up abruptly beating cars with an ax.

Variations
According to some variations of the legend, Goatman is said to have once been a scientist who worked in the Beltsville Agricultural Research Center. In this version, an experiment on goats backfires and the scientist mutates into a half man, half goat creature who begins aggressively attacking cars in the vicinity of Beltsville, Maryland. Another variation of the legend holds that Goatman himself was an old hermit who lived in the woods and often could be seen walking alone at night along Fletchertown Road.

According to University of Maryland folklorist Barry Pearson, the Goatman legend began "long, long, long" ago and were further popularized in 1971 when the death of a dog was blamed on Goatman by local residents. Pearson relates that "bored teenagers" keep the Goatman legend alive by repeating the story and suggesting that the creature attacks couples, frequenting the local lover's lane, subsequently stirring interest in sites like Fletchertown Road.

See also 
 Satyr/Faun
 Pope Lick Monster (Kentucky's "Goat-Sheepman")
 Lake Worth Monster (Texas Goatman)
 Old Alton Bridge (Goatman's Bridge)

References

American legendary creatures
Beltsville, Maryland
Maryland folklore
Satyrs
Urban legends